The Hiker is a statue created by Theo Alice Ruggles Kitson.  It commemorates the American soldiers who fought in the Spanish–American War, the Boxer Rebellion and the Philippine–American War.  The first version of it was made for the University of Minnesota in 1906, but at least 50 copies were made, and were erected widely across the United States.

"The Hiker depicts a hero stripped of his parade uniform and shown as a soldier reacting to the challenges of the battlefield."

Original
When she created The Hiker, Kitson already had a reputation for sculpting war memorial statues. For the title of her work, Kitson used the term that American soldiers in both the Spanish–American War and the Philippine–American War gave themselves: "hikers". Leonard Sefing, Jr., a Spanish–American War veteran from Allentown, Pennsylvania, was selected as the model for the statue after a photograph of him was entered into a national contest.

The original statue was unveiled at the University of Minnesota on Memorial Day, 1906. The statue stands in front of the armory at 15 Church Street. Also known as the Student Soldier Memorial, it is a monument to the 218 University of Minnesota students who served in the Spanish–American War. Today this statue, now missing the muzzle of the rifle, is popularly known as Iron Mike.

Locations

Kitson's work proved to be very popular, largely because of its realism and historical accuracy. In 1921, the Gorham Manufacturing Company, located in Providence, Rhode Island, bought the rights to the statue, and over the next 44 years Gorham cast at least 50 Hiker statues. The earliest installations tended to be in the northeastern United States, with post-World War II statues installed mostly in the South and West.

Because of the wide distribution of the statues, they were used in a 2009 study measuring the effects of air pollution over the last century.

Sources

External links

 

1906 sculptures
Bronze sculptures in the United States
Military monuments and memorials in the United States
Spanish–American War memorials in the United States
Sculpture series
Sculptures of men
Statues in the United States